Woods Harbour is a community in the Canadian province of Nova Scotia, located in the Barrington municipal district of Shelburne County. People from the Woods Harbour area are locally known as "Cockawitters" (or with local slang applying; "Cockawittas"). Cockerwit Passage is a body of water that leads to the mouth of Woods Harbour from the west.

See also
 List of communities in Nova Scotia

References

Hawk, The
General Service Areas in Nova Scotia
Populated coastal places in Canada